Terry Butler (22 April 1958 – 4 October 2016) was an Australian professional rugby league footballer. He played for Wynnum-Manly Seagulls in the Brisbane Rugby League premiership's grand final victory in 1982 as a winger, scoring the first try of the match. The following year he was selected to represent Queensland in Game II of the 1983 State of Origin series. He later had an uneventful year with the North Sydney Bears in the New South Wales Rugby League competition in 1986. He died aged 58 of cancer in 2016.

References

External links
Queensland Representatives at qrl.com.au

1958 births
2016 deaths
Australian rugby league players
Wynnum Manly Seagulls players
Queensland Rugby League State of Origin players
Rugby league centres
North Sydney Bears players
Rugby league wingers
Rugby league fullbacks